Ernest Maduabuchi Ojukwu (born September 23, 1960), is a past Deputy Director-General and Head of Campus of the Nigerian Law School, Augustine Nnamani Campus, Agbani Enugu.  Before his appointment, he was Associate Professor and Dean Faculty of Law, Abia State University, Uturu from 1995-2001.  He is also the President of the Network of University Legal Aid Institutions (NULAI Nigeria), the platform through which he has continued to achieve his dreams of promoting clinical legal education and reform of legal education in Nigeria.

Background
Ernest Ojukwu hails from Ahaba Imenyi in Isuikwuato Local Government of Abia State in South East Nigeria. He attended the Methodist College Uzuakoli and Government College Umuahia. Ojukwu is a graduate of Obafemi Awolowo University Ile-Ife where he received the Bachelor of Laws and Master of Laws Degrees in 1983 and 1987 respectively. He also obtained a certificate on Alternative Dispute Resolution from the University of California Sacramento Center for African Peace and Conflict Resolution.

Career
Ernest Ojukwu began his career in 1985 when he simultaneously joined the services of Abia State University as an Assistant Lecturer and began to practice Law in the chambers of Chief G. N. Atulomah. In 1998, he left to establish with his friends, a Law firm named Eleuthera Chambers. He rose to the position of Dean of the Faculty of Law in Abia State University where he served from 1995-2001. He was also a very active member of the Nigerian Bar Association, serving as Secretary of the Aba Branch of the Association from 1992–1993 and Chairman between 1997 and 1999.   

Ernest Ojukwu has published extensively. He is co-author of Introduction to Civil Procedure, a quality and leading material on Civil Litigation for Law School Students in Nigeria as well Legal Practitioners, Editor of Nigerian Law and Practice Journal, & Editor-In-Chief Nigerian Bar Journal. He is also a leading vanguard in pioneering the development of clinical legal education in Nigeria and is the President of the Network of University Legal Aid Institutions (NULAI Nigeria) which serves to promote clinical legal education and reform of legal education in Nigeria. He is the National Representative of Nigeria in the Brown-Morsten International Client Consultation Competition.

Interests/Activities
Ojukwu’s interest as a scholar includes the subjects of Continuing Legal Education, Civil Litigation and Access to Justice.  He has also continued to play a very active role in the professional activities of the Nigerian Bar Association where he once served as the Chairman, Aba Branch of the Association and presently chairs the Academic Forum and Legal Education Committee.
Ojukwu has conducted several training programmes and workshops for the practicing bar, law teachers and law students. He has attended and presented papers at several International conferences including the International Bar Association where he is a very active member. He was Speaker on Access to Justice: best practices in the design and delivery of Legal Aid: alternative service delivery models, at the International Bar Association Conference Chicago 17–22 September 2006.

Family Life
Ojukwu is married to Hon Justice Ijeoma Ojukwu of the Federal High Court and they have five children.

References

20th-century Nigerian lawyers
Living people
1960 births
21st-century Nigerian lawyers
Government College Umuahia alumni
Academic staff of Abia State University
Academic staff of the Nigerian Law School